FBI Assistant Director Walter Sergei Skinner is a fictional character portrayed by American actor Mitch Pileggi on The X-Files and its short-lived spin-off The Lone Gunmen, both broadcast on  Fox. 

In the science fiction-supernatural series, Skinner supervised the X-Files office, which is concerned with unresolved FBI cases of mysterious or possibly supernatural circumstances. Fox Mulder, the FBI agent in charge of the X-Files, considers the X-Files the truth behind the supposed conspiracy.  Skinner was a main character in the ninth, tenth and eleventh seasons of the show and a recurring character throughout the first eight seasons.

Skinner made his first appearance in the first season 1994 episode "Tooms". At the start of the series, Skinner was dismissive towards Mulder's belief in extraterrestrial and other strange phenomena.  However, throughout the series Skinner has moved on to respect and agree with Mulder's idea, which is finally proven in "Requiem", when he saw an Alien spacecraft.
Skinner has received critical acclaim and has become a fan favorite.

Pileggi received the role of Walter Skinner after "two or three" auditions for the role. Beginning with only a small cameo, his character frequently made more appearances during the second season.

Character arc 
Skinner is a former Marine and a Vietnam War veteran. In the war he once killed a boy at a very short distance, an experience which has scarred him for life. He is married to Sharon Skinner. He has been treated at a sleep disorder clinic, suffering from recurring dreams of an old woman, which may either be a hallucination arising from drug use during Vietnam or a succubus. Skinner's hobbies include jogging and boxing, the latter of which has been shown in his ability to outfight Fox Mulder and X and to defend himself reasonably well when he was attacked by Alex Krycek and his men.

Skinner took personal administrative charge of the X-Files in the latter haIf of Season 1, replacing Section Chief Scott Blevins. Initially, Skinner acts solely as a supervisor to Agent Mulder and Dana Scully's investigations of the paranormal. In the early episodes, it is unclear whether he is entirely independent of his actions or controlled by men such as the "Cigarette Smoking Man". Eventually, Skinner begins trusting Mulder and Scully and becomes their ally, saving both of their lives on multiple occasions. He stands up to the conspirators that tried to control him, for which he frequently pays throughout the series.

After Skinner has long broken free of the "Cigarette Smoking Man", he is again forced to take orders, this time from Alex Krycek. He is covertly infected with nanotechnology, which gives Krycek the leverage to control him. Two years later, Skinner is finally able to rid himself of Krycek, when during an attempt by Krycek on Mulder's life, Skinner fatally shoots Krycek. At Mulder's murder trial, Skinner is asked to act as Mulder's lawyer, having become a supporter of Mulder's cause. Later, Skinner and Deputy Director Alvin Kersh confront the "Toothpick Man" in Kersh's office, after Agents John Doggett and Monica Reyes discover that the X-Files office had been emptied out. This results in another, apparently permanent, closing of the X-Files division. Six years later, with the X-Files  still closed down, Skinner assists Scully in finding Mulder after he goes missing while consulting on the FBI's investigation into the disappearance of a missing agent. Mulder and Skinner are shown to still be on friendly terms, despite Mulder's animosity towards the FBI for the events following the trial.

Conceptual history

Creation and development 

The role of Walter Skinner was played by actor Mitch Pileggi, who had unsuccessfully auditioned for two or three other characters on The X-Files before getting the part. At first, the fact that he was asked back to audition for the recurring role slightly puzzled him, until he discovered the reason he had not previously been cast in those roles — Chris Carter had been unable to envision Pileggi as any of those characters, due to the fact that the actor had been shaving his head. When the actor had attended the audition for Walter Skinner, he had been in a grumpy mood and had allowed his small amount of hair to grow back. Pileggi's attitude fit well with Walter Skinner's character, causing Carter to assume that the actor was only pretending to be grumpy. After successfully auditioning for the role, Pileggi thought he had been lucky that he had not been cast in one of the earlier roles, as he believed he would have appeared in only a single episode and would have missed the opportunity to play the recurring role of Walter Skinner.

Pileggi himself thought he got the role because of Gillian Anderson's (who portrayed Dana Scully) pregnancy during the second season, saying the producers felt they needed to take the "show in a different direction" while she was pregnant. So Pileggi felt at the start that he "compensated" for the situation of the show, and after a while the character started to grow on the producers and fellow cast, as Pileggi puts it, "the character just started kind of clicking and working". At the end of the second season, the producers wanted Pileggi to return in future episodes, so he signed a six-year contract with them.

In an interview with X-Files fan site host Robin Mayhall, Pileggi commented once that he felt David Duchovny's (portrayed Fox Mulder) semi-departure in season eight and the introduction of Robert Patrick's John Doggett, and the fact that he started to believe in Aliens at the end of season seven, Skinner was given the "opportunity to grow", further stating "new avenues" had been opened. While Pileggi stated that he missed Duchovny's presence in The X-Files, he continued saying that he did not have the opportunity to work with him during the seventh season. He even went as far as saying that there was no "interaction between" the two characters. He was positive to the new storyline conceived during Duchovny's departure, saying it gave the show a "shot in the arm," which reinvented the show.

I Want to Believe 
As writers Carter and Frank Spotnitz aimed to avoid complicating the storyline of The X-Files: I Want to Believe with superfluous appearances of characters from the television series, Skinner is the only returning character in the movie. He was included in the film's plot only when a fitting opportunity to involve him arose, and Spotnitz and Carter were very happy to write Skinner into the story. The scenes of The X-Files: I Want to Believe that include Skinner were filmed very late in the movie's filming schedule, and the particular scene that acts as the character's introduction in the movie was filmed, for reasons of time, in two different locations.

Reception 
The character received critical acclaim from fans and critics alike and since became a fan's favourite of the show. Mitch Pileggi received acclaim for his portrayal of the character.

While not winning or getting nominated for any of his work alone in The X-Files, Mitch Pileggi and several other cast members were nominated in the category "Outstanding Performance by an Ensemble in a Drama Series" by the Screen Actors Guild Awards in 1997, 1998 and 1999 but did not win. Following the broadcast of "One Breath", in which Skinner recalls serving as a US Marine during the Vietnam War, Pileggi received several fan letters from Vietnam veterans. Ben-Rawson Jones named the character of Skinner a "Spy cult icon" in 2008, describing him as the "corporate middle man".

George Avalos and Michael Liedtke from the Contra Costa Times both reacted positively to the death of Alex Krycek at the hands of Skinner, saying it was the best scene of the eighth season finale, "Existence". Another review from the same site and writers said the season eight episode, "Via Negativa", said the story "clicked" largely thanks to Skinner along with Alvin Kersh, saying that Skinner "delivered another Mulderesque". In a review of The X-Files feature film, Soren Andersen from The News Tribune said the character was "underused" both in the series and film. Entertainment Weekly reviewer Bruce Fretts said Skinner brought "a real element of danger to the show."

References

Notes

Bibliography

External links

The X-Files characters
Fictional Vietnam War veterans
Fictional executives of the Federal Bureau of Investigation
Television characters introduced in 1994
Fictional United States Marine Corps personnel
Fictional characters with post-traumatic stress disorder